The Kaliganga River is a river in Bangladesh that runs for 78 km. The Kaliganga takes off from the Brahmaputra River and flows to the south.

In recent years the amount of water extracted for irrigation has much reduced its size outside of the rainy season.

References

Rivers of Bangladesh
Rivers of Khulna Division